The City Mission Society, is a social justice agency founded in 1816 by the congregations of Old South Church and Park Street Church with a mission to serve the urban poor of metropolitan Boston, Massachusetts.

Nearly 200 years old, the City Mission Society has been a party to the establishment of programs serving children and families, and has helped to found several now independent schools and social service agencies. Today, the society provides services to more than 3000 individuals in the form of education, advocacy and direct aid. The organization works with urban youth, families, congregations, and prison populations.

External links
 Web site of the City Mission Society

Non-profit organizations based in Boston
Youth organizations based in Massachusetts
Community building
1816 establishments in Massachusetts
African-American culture
Education in Boston
Organizations established in 1816